BankSA, formerly known as the Bank of South Australia, the State Bank of South Australia and the Savings Bank of South Australia is the largest bank in South Australia. It is a subsidiary of Westpac.

History

Bank SA, formerly known as The Bank of South Australia is a full service bank and private financial services provider offering: personal, business and corporate banking. Initially established as a savings deposit bank on March 11 1848 in South Australia (BankSA, 2021), it has a long-standing independent history serving mostly rural clients in the South Australia and Victoria fringes. Beginning as a sole employee company, John Hector, the founding employee, established the bank's deposit book in the original offices in Gawler Place, Adelaide (Ibid). BankSA has undergone significant transformation, initially being acquired by St George Bank and later becoming a division of Westpac Banking Corporation in 2008 by their merger.

Legal structure
BankSA is a wholly owned entity of St George Bank, which is owned by the Westpac Banking Corporation. Westpac is a publicly listed ASX private company with an Australian Financial Services Licence (AFSL). Both BankSA and Westpac are a part of the Australian Prudential Banking Deposit Scheme, which gives government assurances of all deposits placed into the bank in the event of financial crises (APRA, 2021). The Australian big four banks are involved in the Deposit Scheme as a means of assuring customers of the safety of their deposits and to foster public trust in the Australian banking system. (Eggleston, 2011)

First clients and customer formation
The bank's first depositor was an Afghan shepherd, who deposited savings of 29 pounds (£29) into the then Savings Bank of South Australia, with a further 12 clients aggregating 172 pounds and six shillings (£172/06/00) on the first trading day. The genesis of the lending arm and the first constructed loan granted by BankSA (then known as the Savings Bank of south Australia) was for the purchase of housing and farming land by John Colton who borrowed a sum of 500 pounds (£500) for the purchase of two acres of land with farming and residential facilities. In the establishment of Australian colonial society, banks were for deposits only, until the formation of the Australian credit system allowed for the proper provision of loans, supported by government financial assurance. (Malik, 2021)

Merger history and establishment
Prior to its current rebrand initiated in October 2014, BankSA was formerly known as The Bank of South Australia. The predecessor of the bank  was The Savings Bank of South Australia founded in 1848, and The State Bank of South Australia. These outfits merged under the name The State Bank of South Australia in 1984.

The State Bank of South Australia was compartmentalised and bought by The Advance Bank due to deteriorating loan book and financial management (McCarthy, 2017). The Savings Bank was on the verge of collapse prior to a bailout by the State Government of South Australia, which was hastened by the 1991 Royal Dommission Into The Organisation Of Public State Funds of South Australia (Ibid). Advance Bank was purchased by St. George Bank in 1997 and The State Bank became part of the greater Westpac Corporation once it merged with St. George Bank.

Technology and digital banking
Westpac and synonymously BankSA launched online banking services via internet and smartphone application December 5, 2015 Following the digitalisation of most banking practises in Australia (Westpac, 2021). BankSA has adopted digital banking standards, including PayWave features on credit card products, ApplePay and banking services via phone application, internet banking and phone banking. BankSA has also been one of the banks to partner with fintech company AfterPay which is a 'buy now, pay later' service. BankSA is adopting technology and digital strategy at the pace of its parent company Westpac. It has not acknowledged or adopted cryptocurrency trading platforms (Lalchandani, 2020), unlike its competitor The Commonwealth Bank. In an academic article about banking competition law, Dr leela Ceejnar from the University of Sydney suggests banks reject product competition in times of economic turbulence. This is to foster financial stability during periods of uncertainty (Ceejnar, 2012) as decentralised currency can pose risks to public finance.

Adelaide Fringe partnership
In November 2005, the State Bank began its sponsorship of Australia's biggest arts festival, the Adelaide Fringe, with a  partnership until 2010. This sponsorship has been renewed, and BankSA is the Fringe's principal partner until at least 2022.

Further local alliances
BankSA is a private company that also extends its banking services to government and public institutions, and fellow private businesses, including the entities listed below:
 Law Society of South Australia 
 Country Fire Service Volunteers' Association 
 Australian Medical Association 
 Port Adelaide Football Club 
Local South Australian accounting, financial planning, legal and real estate firms

Implications in Royal Commissions past and present
BankSA has not been the subject of Royal Commission findings, however it does have an indirect history in two separate Royal Commissions. The 1991 Royal Commission in South Australia determined that the State Bank of South Australia had an underperforming loan book due to weak lending rules and operational inefficiencies, which led to a government bailout (Malik, 2021). As part of the Commission findings, the State Bank of South Australia had to separate and sell off the profitable part of its bank to Advance Bank, which was acquired by the greater Westpac outfit in 2008. The Royal Commission findings of 1991 and the remediation pressure of those findings ultimately led to the formation of BankSA from the failure of the State Bank of south Australia (Malik, 2021).

Furthermore, BankSA's ultimate parent company, Westpac, was implicated in the Banking Royal Commission of 2017 and was ordered to pay the largest penalty of $1.3 billion for money laundering (Ryan, 2020). Ultimately BankSA was not directly implicated in any penalty or criminal action.

References

External links

Banks of Australia
Banks established in 1848
Companies based in Adelaide
Australian companies established in 1848
Westpac